Thomas Daniel Creavy (February 3, 1911 – March 3, 1979) was an American professional golfer, the winner of the PGA Championship in 1931.

Born in Tuckahoe, New York, Creavy learned the game as a caddie at Siwanoy Country Club, and was the club professional at the Albany Country Club and Saratoga Spa. He won the PGA Championship at age 20 in 1931 at Wannamoisett Country Club in Rumford, Rhode Island, defeating Gene Sarazen 5 & 3 in the semifinals and Denny Shute 2 & 1 in the finals. Creavy played in 11 major championships, including the inaugural Masters in 1934. He had an outstanding short game, but his competitive playing career was hampered by recurring back problems and shortened by spinal meningitis in 1943.

Creavy died of a heart attack in 1979 at age 68 in Delray Beach, Florida.

Professional wins

PGA Tour wins (2)
1931 (1) PGA Championship
1934 (1) San Francisco National Match Play Open

Major championships

Wins (1)

Note: The PGA Championship was match play until 1958

Results timeline

Note: Creavy never played in The Open Championship.

NYF = tournament not yet founded
DNQ = did not qualify for match play portion 
CUT = missed the half-way cut
R64, R32, R16, QF, SF = round in which player lost in PGA Championship match play
"T" indicates a tie for a place

See also
Chronological list of men's major golf champions
List of men's major championships winning golfers

References

External links
Albany golfer an almost-forgotten winner of 1931 PGA Championship
Creavy golfing family

American male golfers
PGA Tour golfers
Winners of men's major golf championships
Golfers from New York (state)
People from Tuckahoe, Westchester County, New York
1911 births
1979 deaths